Dapper Laughs: On the Pull is a British television dating show which mixed comedy sketches with real-life situations and featured comedian Daniel O'Reilly, in character as Dapper Laughs, offering dating tips to members of the public. The show was largely based on the content of his Vines which was how he was discovered.

The show was criticised as sexist and promoting violence against women. Following these criticisms and a campaign to have the show discontinued, ITV announced that a second series would not be commissioned.

References

External links
 
 

2010s British reality television series
2014 British television series debuts
2014 British television series endings
British dating and relationship reality television series
English-language television shows
ITV comedy
2014 controversies
Television series by Hungry Bear Media
Television controversies in the United Kingdom